In geometry, the trilinear coordinates  of a point relative to a given triangle describe the relative directed distances from the three sidelines of the triangle. Trilinear coordinates are an example of homogeneous coordinates.

In the diagram at right, the trilinear coordinates of the indicated interior point are the actual distances, or equivalently in ratio form,  for any positive constant . If a point is on a sideline of the reference triangle, its corresponding trilinear coordinate is 0. If an exterior point is on the opposite side of a sideline from the interior of the triangle, its trilinear coordinate associated with that sideline is negative. It is impossible for all three trilinear coordinates to be non-positive.

Notation

The ratio notation  for trilinear coordinates is different from the ordered triple notation  for actual directed distances. Thus "comma notation" for trilinear coordinates should be avoided, because the notation , which means an ordered triple, does not allow, for example, whereas the "colon notation" does allow .

Examples

Given side lengths  we have:

 
 
 
 incenter = 
 centroid = .
 circumcenter = .
 orthocenter = .
 nine-point center = .
 symmedian point = .
 -excenter = 
 -excenter = 
 -excenter = .

Note that, in general, the incenter is not the same as the centroid; the centroid has barycentric coordinates  (these being proportional to actual signed areas of the triangles , where  = centroid.)

Formulas

Collinearities and concurrencies

Trilinear coordinates enable many algebraic methods in triangle geometry.  For example, three points

are collinear if and only if the determinant

equals zero.

The dual of this proposition is that the lines

concur in a point  if and only if .

Parallel lines

where  are the side lengths.

Angle between two lines

Perpendicular lines

Altitude

The equation of the altitude from vertex  to side  is

Line in terms of distances from vertices

Actual-distance trilinear coordinates

The trilinears with the coordinate values   being the actual perpendicular distances to the sides satisfy

for triangle sides  and area . This can be seen in the figure at the top of this article, with interior point  partitioning triangle  into three triangles  with respective areas

Distance between two points

The distance  between two points with actual-distance trilinears  is given by

or in a more symmetric way

Distance from a point to a line

The distance  from a point , in trilinear coordinates of actual distances, to a straight line  is

Quadratic curves

The equation of a conic section in the variable trilinear point  is

It has no linear terms and no constant term.

The equation of a circle of radius  having center at actual-distance coordinates  is

Circumconics

The equation in trilinear coordinates  of any circumconic of a triangle is

If the parameters  respectively equal the side lengths  (or the sines of the angles opposite them) then the equation gives the circumcircle.

Each distinct circumconic has a center unique to itself. The equation in trilinear coordinates of the circumconic with center {{math|x' :  y' : z' }} is

Inconics

Every conic section inscribed in a triangle has an equation in trilinear coordinates:

with exactly one or three of the unspecified signs being negative.

The equation of the incircle can be simplified to

while the equation for, for example, the excircle adjacent to the side segment opposite vertex  can be written as

Cubic curves
Many cubic curves are easily represented using trilinear coordinates.

Among named cubics  are the following:

 Thomson cubic: Z(X(2),X(1)), where X(2) = centroid, X(1) = incenter
 Feuerbach cubic: Z(X(5),X(1)), where X(5) = Feuerbach point
 Darboux cubic: Z(X(20),X(1)), where X(20) = De Longchamps point
 Neuberg cubic: Z(X(30),X(1)), where X(30) = ''Euler infinity point.

Conversions

Between trilinear coordinates and distances from sidelines

Between barycentric and trilinear coordinates
A point with trilinear coordinates  has barycentric coordinates  where  are the sidelengths of the triangle.  Conversely, a point with barycentrics  has trilinear coordinates

Between Cartesian and trilinear coordinates
Given a reference triangle , express the position of the vertex  in terms of an ordered pair of Cartesian coordinates and represent this algebraically as a vector  using vertex  as the origin.

 

and the conversion formula from the trilinear coordinates to the coefficients in the Cartesian representation is

 

Hence the conversion formula from the trilinear coordinates   to the vector of Cartesian coordinates  of the point is given by

 

where the side lengths are

See also

Morley's trisector theorem#Morley's triangles, giving examples of numerous points expressed in trilinear coordinates
Ternary plot
Viviani's theorem

References

External links

Encyclopedia of Triangle Centers - ETC by Clark Kimberling; has trilinear coordinates (and barycentric) for more than 7000 triangle centers

Linear algebra
Affine geometry
Triangle geometry
Coordinate systems